Army Medical Department may refer to:
 The Army Medical Department of the British Army, forerunner to the Royal Army Medical Corps
 Army Medical Department (United States)